is a former Japanese football player.

Playing career
Kasahara was born in Gunma Prefecture on May 9, 1976. After graduating from University of Tsukuba, he joined the Japan Football League club Otsuka Pharmaceutical in 1999. He played in many matches. In 2000, he moved to the newly promoted J2 League club, Mito HollyHock. He became a regular player and played in many matches as midfielder in 2000. However he was not played at all in 2001. In 2002, he moved to the Regional Leagues club Tonan SC. He retired at the end of the 2002 season.

Club statistics

References

External links

1976 births
Living people
University of Tsukuba alumni
Association football people from Gunma Prefecture
Japanese footballers
J2 League players
Japan Football League players
Tokushima Vortis players
Mito HollyHock players
Association football defenders